Luxuria may refer to:
The vice of Lust
Luxuria, a genus of molluscs
Luxuria (band), a British pop group
Wesolowskana, a genus of spiders formerly called Luxuria
Vladimir Luxuria, Italian showperson and politician